is a waterfall located in  Nikaho, Akita Prefecture, Japan. It became a nationally designated Place of Scenic Beauty in 1932. Although not selected as one of "Japan’s Top 100 Waterfalls", it was included in the listing of the "100 New Tourist Attractions of Japan" in a contest sponsored by the Mainichi Shinbun newspaper in 1950.

Overview
The falls are located within Chōkai Quasi-National Park at an altitude of 150 meters, on the upper reaches of the Naso River. The falls are located near a Shinto shrine, the Kinpo Jinja, which was founded in the early Heian period. It is connected to the shrine by a footpath.

See also
List of Places of Scenic Beauty of Japan (Akita)

References

External links

Akita Prefecture Official Tourist Information 
Japan Travel

Landforms of Akita Prefecture
Places of Scenic Beauty
Nikaho, Akita
Waterfalls of Japan
Tourist attractions in Akita Prefecture